Annette Crosbie  (born 12 February 1934) is a Scottish actor. She is best known for her role as Margaret Meldrew in the BBC sitcom One Foot in the Grave (1990–2000). She twice won the BAFTA TV Award for Best Actress, for The Six Wives of Henry VIII in 1971 and Edward the Seventh. In 1976, she was nominated for the BAFTA Award for Best Actress in a Supporting Role for the 1976 film The Slipper and the Rose and she won the award for Best Actress at the Evening Standard British Film Awards for the same role. Her other film appearances include The Pope Must Die (1991), Shooting Fish (1997), The Debt Collector (1999), Calendar Girls (2003) and Into the Woods (2014).

Early life and career
Crosbie was born in Gorebridge, Midlothian, Scotland, to Presbyterian parents who disapproved of her becoming an actress. Nevertheless, she joined the Bristol Old Vic Theatre School while still in her teens. She began her career with the Glasgow Citizens' Theatre Company in 1956. She was educated at Boroughmuir High School in Edinburgh. Her big break came in 1970 when she was cast as Catherine of Aragon in the BBC television series The Six Wives of Henry VIII, for which she won the 1971 BAFTA TV Award for Best Actress. In 1973, she starred alongside Vanessa Redgrave in the BBC serial A Picture of Katherine Mansfield.

In 1975, Crosbie made a similar impact as another queen, Queen Victoria, in the ITV period drama Edward the Seventh,  for which she won the 1976 BAFTA TV Award for Best Actress. She played Cinderella's fairy godmother in The Slipper and the Rose, which was chosen as the Royal Film Première for 1976. In that film, Crosbie sang the Sherman Brothers' song, "Suddenly It Happens". Crosbie voiced the character of Galadriel in Ralph Bakshi's animated movie, The Lord of the Rings, filmed in 1978. In 1980, she played the abbess in Hawk the Slayer. In 1986, she appeared as the vicar's wife in Paradise Postponed.

Crosbie's next major role was as Margaret Meldrew, the long-suffering wife of Victor Meldrew (Richard Wilson) in the BBC sitcom One Foot in the Grave (1990–2000) for which she is best known. She also played Janet, the housekeeper to Dr. Finlay, in the 1993–96 revival of A. J. Cronin's popular stories. She also had a poignant role in the thriller The Debt Collector (1999).

Crosbie's other roles include playing the monkey-lover Ingrid Strange in an episode of Jonathan Creek (1997), Edith Sparshott in An Unsuitable Job for a Woman (1997–2001), and Jessie in the film Calendar Girls (2003).

In 2008, Crosbie appeared in a BBC adaptation of Little Dorrit. In 2009 she played Sadie Cairncross in the BBC television series Hope Springs. In 2010, Crosbie appeared in the Doctor Who episode "The Eleventh Hour" and in an episode of New Tricks. In 2014 Crosbie appeared in the movies What We Did on Our Holiday and Into the Woods. In 2015 she appeared in a BBC adaptation of Cider with Rosie. In 2016 she appeared in the new film version of Dad's Army. In 2019 she appeared in an episode of Call the Midwife.

In 2020, Crosbie appeared in an episode of the second season of After Life, a British black comedy-drama series created, written, produced and directed by Ricky Gervais, which premiered on Netflix.

Honours
Crosbie was awarded the rank of Officer of the Order of the British Empire (OBE) in the 1998 New Year Honours for services to Drama.

Personal life
Crosbie was married to Michael Griffiths, the father of her son Owen and daughter Selina, who is also an actor.

Crosbie is a campaigner for greyhound welfare. From 2003, she was President of the League Against Cruel Sports.

Crosbie lives in Wimbledon, London.

Filmography

Film

Television

Radio Appearances
 Good Behaviour (2014) on BBC Radio 4
 One Foot in the Grave (1995) 4 episodes adapted from the British television sitcom of the same name, first aired between 21 January 1995 and 11 February 1995 on BBC Radio 2. The episodes are "Alive and Buried", "In Luton Airport, No One Can Hear You Scream", "Timeless Time" and "The Beast in the Cage". They are repeated regularly on BBC Radio 4 Extra.
 Old Harry's Game as Edith Cordelia Barrington (from series 6 onwards) on BBC Radio 4
 The Price of Fear - Episode: To My Dear, Dear Saladin (6 June 1983) on BBC Radio 4
 The works of Robert Burns (2016) for BBC Radio Scotland

Awards and nominations

References

External links

Alumni of Bristol Old Vic Theatre School
Best Actress BAFTA Award (television) winners
Officers of the Order of the British Empire
People from Midlothian
Scottish television actresses
Scottish film actresses
Scottish radio actresses
Scottish stage actresses
1934 births
Living people
People educated at Boroughmuir High School
20th-century Scottish actresses
21st-century Scottish actresses